This is a basic glossary of disc golf terms that includes both technical terminology and jargon developed over the years in the sport of disc golf. Where noted, some terms are used only in American English (US), only in British English (UK), or are regional to a particular part of the world, such as Australia (AU).

Where words in a sentence are also defined elsewhere in this article, they appear in italics.

0-9

A

B

C

D

E

F

G

H

K

L

M

O

P

R

S

T

U

See also 

 Glossary of golf

References 

https://www.innovadiscs.com/home/disc-golf-faq/flight-ratings-system/

Disc golf
Wikipedia glossaries using description lists